Landon T. Clay (born Landon Thomas Clay, 1926 – July 29, 2017) was an American businessman and founder of the Clay Mathematics Institute. He died on July 29, 2017 at his home in Peterborough, New Hampshire.

Biography
Clay graduated from Harvard in 1950 with a B.A. in English. Clay was the chairman of Eaton Vance Corporation from 1971 to 1997 and had been a director of ADE Corporation since 1970 – a mutual fund management and distribution company. Clay served as chairman of the East Hill Management LLC, which is an investment advisory firm that he had founded in 1997. Clay had been a director for the Dakota Mining corporation since 1990 and was a former director for the Golden Queen Mining Company Ltd. from 2006 to 2009. In addition from 1971 to 1997, Clay had served on the board of Museum of Fine Arts. Clay had also served as a director for Plasso Technology Limited.

Clay was also a supporter of astronomy, with one of his gifts through the Harvard College Observatory leading the Magellan Telescopes consortium to name one of the two 6.5-m components of the Magellan Telescope to be named for him, as well as a provider of Clay Postdoctoral Fellowships at the Smithsonian Astrophysical Observatory, part of the Center for Astrophysics  Harvard & Smithsonian.    He also supported the Clay Center Observatory with its 24-inch telescope at the Dexter-Southfield School in Brookline, Massachusetts.

References

American businesspeople
Harvard College alumni
1926 births
2017 deaths
People from Peterborough, New Hampshire
Harvard College Observatory people